Pompignac is a commune in the Gironde department in the Nouvelle-Aquitaine region in Southwestern France. In 2019, it had a population of 3,170.

Geography

Demographics

Notable people
 Wim Crusio, behavioral neurogeneticist

See also
Communes of the Gironde department

References

Communes of Gironde